KPNE may refer to:

 KPNE-FM, a radio station (91.7 FM) licensed to North Platte, Nebraska, United States
 KPNE-TV, a television station (channel 9) licensed to North Platte, Nebraska, United States
 The ICAO code for Northeast Philadelphia Airport